Archie Williams (13 May 1927 – 29 September 1985) was a Scottish football player, who played for Hearts, Motherwell and Dunfermline.

References

External links 

1927 births
1985 deaths
Footballers from Edinburgh
Association football wingers
Scottish footballers
Heart of Midlothian F.C. players
Motherwell F.C. players
Dunfermline Athletic F.C. players
Scottish Football League players